The Lake Gala National Park, established on March 5, 2005, is a national park located within Edirne Province in Marmara Region of Turkey.

The national park covers an area consisting of Lake Pamuklu and Lake Küçük Gala within the boundaries of İpsala and Enez districts of Edirne Province.

In 1991,  of land was declared a nature reserve. In 2002, biologists from Trakya University in Edirne demanded transformation of the protected area into national park status due to pollution of lakes by pesticide waste and fertilizer, used in agriculture, as well as uncontrolled fishing activities and bird poaching that reach a level of massacre. Lake Gala National Park is an ecosystem of  wetland, lake and  forest. It is a habitat for various plant and animal species.

The protected area is administered by the Directorate-General of Nature Protection and National Parks of the Ministry of Environment and Forest.

The national park is situated within the Maritsa Delta Wetland , which is a Ramsar site of A-class meeting three criteria.

Fauna
Birds
The park is quite rich of bird genera. The area hosts around 45,000 birds. Some 163 bird species are observed in the area, of which 46 are resident, 27 winter migratory and 90 summer migratory birds. Best time to observe most of the bird species all together is between April and May in the spring, and September and October in the fall.

Fish
The two lakes are home to 16 fish genera, including European eel (Anguilla anguilla, L.), pike perch (Stizostedion lucioperca L.), common carp (Cyprinus carpio L.) and northern pike (Esox lucius), which are of high economic value.

References

Protected areas established in 2005
National parks of Turkey
Geography of Edirne Province
Gala
Landforms of Edirne Province
Tourist attractions in Edirne Province
2005 establishments in Turkey
İpsala District